Star Trek is an American media franchise based on the science fiction television series created by Gene Roddenberry. The first television series, simply called Star Trek and now referred to as "The Original Series", debuted in 1966 and aired for three seasons on NBC. The Star Trek canon includes The Original Series, seven spin-off television series, two animated series, and thirteen films.

Star Trek (2009) won an Academy Award for Best Makeup and Hair. This is the first Academy Award for the Star Trek franchise: there have been sixteen nominations since the first Star Trek movie in 1979: three for Star Trek: The Motion Picture, four for Star Trek IV: The Voyage Home, two for Star Trek VI: The Undiscovered Country, one for Star Trek: First Contact, four for Star Trek (2009), one for Star Trek Into Darkness and one for Star Trek Beyond.

Star Trek: The Motion Picture received a Golden Globe nomination for Best Original Score, this is the only time a Star Trek film has been nominated for a Golden Globe.

Currently, of the thirteen Star Trek films, only Star Trek V: The Final Frontier has not received a Saturn Award nomination for Best Science Fiction Film.

Accolades

Academy Awards

Golden Globe Awards

Hugo Award

Saturn Awards

Golden Raspberry Awards

References

External links 

Accolades
Lists of accolades by film series
Lists of accolades by franchises
Lists of Star Trek awards and nominations